John Robert Putnam French Jr. (August 7, 1913 – October 14, 1995) was an American psychologist who served as professor emeritus at the University of Michigan. He may be best known for his collaboration with Bertram Raven on French and Raven's five bases of power in 1959.

Life and career
John (Jack) French was born in Boston and graduated from Antioch College, Ohio, and Black Mountain College, North Carolina. In 1940 French received his doctorate from Harvard University, completing a dissertation on the cohesion of groups under distress. He became noted as an expert in social psychology and experimental research, especially in the application of Kurt Lewin's field theory to organizational and industrial settings.

French published widely. He served as a program director at the Research Center for Group Dynamics in 1947, and as president of the Society of Psychological Study of Social Issues. He received the National Institute for Mental Health's Research Career Award and was the recipient of a Fulbright Fellowship.
 
In 1937 French married Sophia L. Hunt and the couple had two children, Rebecca Kennedy and John R. P. French III. He died at Glacier Hills Nursing Center at the age of 82.

References

 Bertram Raven, French, John R. P. Jr. (1913-1995), in ''Encyclopedia of Power, Keith Dowding ed., SAGE Publications Inc, 2011.

1913 births
1995 deaths
American social psychologists
Antioch College alumni
Black Mountain College alumni
Harvard University alumni
University of Michigan faculty
Fulbright alumni